Tiffany Red (born December 24, 1986) is an American R&B singer-songwriter. She has written songs for Zendaya, Jason Derulo, and Tamar Braxton. Red garnered her first Grammy Award in 2009 for her contributions to Jennifer Hudson's self-titled album, which won Best R&B Album of the year.. Red was again nominated in 2014 for her contributions to Fantasia's album Side Effects Of You, nominated for Best Urban Contemporary Album of the year.

Raised in Sicklerville, New Jersey, Red released her first EP as a recording artist titled “Drake”, an homage to the Toronto rapper, in late 2017. The release drew interest from the likes of Revolt TV who described Fred as a "well-rounded artist who can not only pen the songs you love, but deliver sonically as well."

References

1986 births
Singer-songwriters from New Jersey
People from Winslow Township, New Jersey
Living people
21st-century American singers